The Österreichisches Wörterbuch (English: Austrian Dictionary), abbreviated ÖWB, is the official spelling dictionary of the German language in the Republic of Austria. It is edited by a group of linguists under the authority of the Austrian Federal Ministry of Education, Arts and Culture (Bundesministerium für Unterricht, Kunst und Kultur) and contains a number of terms unique to Austrian German or that are more frequently used or differently pronounced there. A considerable amount of this "Austrian" vocabulary is also common in Southern Germany, especially Bavaria, and some of it is used in Switzerland as well. The most recent edition is the 43rd from 2017. Since the 39th edition from 2001 the orthography of the ÖWB was adjusted to the German spelling reform of 1996. This dictionary is also in official use in the Italian province of South Tyrol.

History

The first edition of the Austrian Dictionary was edited in 1951 on an initiative from the then Austrian minister of education Felix Hurdes. It replaced the old "Regeln für die deutsche Rechtschreibung nebst Wörterbuch", a standard work for the German orthography that dated back to pre-World War I times (1879 and 1902). The first edition had 276 pages and around 20,000 entries and was designed for use in the Austrian educational system.

At that time, only six years after World War II, Austria was still under allied administration and the Austrian civilian government tried to cut political ties to Germany, including cultural and linguistic reminiscences to the former Nazi regime. The creation of the Austrian dictionary has to be assessed under these circumstances. The annexation of Austria into Greater Germany in 1938 had also brought a unified official standard form of the German language, that was now revised by referring to pre-war Austrian standards and by including local vocabulary originating from Austro-Bavarian dialects, especially but not exclusively typical Viennese terms.

The Austrian dictionary hence defined the Austrian form of Standard German, making it official and obligatory for use in schools and in public administration. For private persons, the business correspondence of companies, publishing houses and newspapers it remained an orthographic recommendation.

Since then it was republished and expanded in numerous editions, that were each published in three different versions: a reduced version for primary schools (Volksschule), a medium sized version for high schools (Hauptschule, Gymnasium) and a full version for the general public. The 35th edition from 1979 was considerably expanded in the listed vocabulary and with the 39th edition from 2001 the reformed German orthography was adopted. This new standardized orthography, that was determined by an international group of experts from Germany, Switzerland and Austria, led to considerable debates and refusal in Austria. Most newspapers switched to the reformed orthography but some later revoked their decisions and now use either the old version or a separate in-house orthography (Hausrechtschreibung).

The Austrian dictionary remained with the reformed orthography, only at terms that are differently pronounced in Austria, the orthography differs from the German standard. Nevertheless the ÖWB still includes a considerable amount of unique vocabulary, that was even expanded in the newest 40th edition.

Characteristics
The full version of the 2006 40th edition contains around 80,000 terms on 1,008 pages. The school version is 864 pages, and the small version has 20,000 terms. The authors of this edition were the linguists Otto Back, Erich Benedikt, Karl Blüml, Jakob Ebner and Hermann Möcker from the Institute of Austrian Studies (Institut für Österreichkunde), as well as the dialectogists Maria Hornung, Professor Heinz Dieter Pohl from the University of Klagenfurt and Emeritus professor Herbert Tatzreiter from the University of Vienna.

About 3,000 new terms were added to the 39th edition, among them Austrian neologisms such as "E-Card" for the Austrian social security card, "", a legal term for a special retirement law, and "". From the colloquial vocabulary new terms were added such as "" (geriatric nurse), "" (to get fed up), "" (without transfer fee), „Audiobook“, „Afro-Look“ und „Alkopops“ (soft drink with liquor). New technological terms were also added, like: "", "", "", "Linux" and even "Wikipedia".

New terms might differ from their counterparts in Germany. The Austrian dictionary now sets the term "" (to text message, pronounced as-am-as-an) as standard, whereas the Duden uses "", both derived from the English abbreviation "SMS" for "short message service".

Numerous outdated words were removed from the 40th edition, either because their reference in the real world ceased to exist or because they became out of fashion. Examples are "", "" und "". However, the terms "Schilling" and "" are listed, although their signifiants no longer exist. Still included are some typical dialect terms, that continue to be used in the written language, such as the Carinthian "" (common beans) or the word "" or "" for a wicker basket.

Other typically Austrian words in the dictionary are for example: " (drunkenness), "" (grocery shop), "" (complicated situation), "" (easy opponent in sports), "" (a cheese-filled Carniolan sausage), "" (terrific), "" (a linesman), "" (unreported employment), "" (fine), "", "" (a medal rank in sports), "" (a hip nightclub), "" (to booze), "" (chewy, tough) and "" (to crumple).

Some parents protested against the 39th edition, arguing that there were too many "dirty words" listed, some of which have subsequently been removed from the school version of the 40th edition.

Language policy
The objective of the Austrian dictionary has never been to do classical language planning, but to do a re-codification of the form of the German language used in Austria. New terms were only included to the dictionary, when they had already been in considerable use in newspapers and contemporary literature.

Although the dictionary was originally designed to promote Austrianism and language patriotism, throughout the years the dictionary commission followed a moderate policy of contrastive linguistics and tried to avoid language secessionism. Nevertheless in the case of conflicting definitions the Austrian dictionary overrules the Duden and remains the sole source for defining the Austrian standard. In post-World War II Austria the German Duden never had any legal authority, although informally it is also widely in use as a work of reference.

See also
 Austrian German
 Austro-Bavarian
 Deutsches Wörterbuch List of German dictionaries

 References 

Literature
 Österreichisches Wörterbuch – auf der Grundlage des amtlichen Regelwerks (neue Rechtschreibung); herausgegeben im Auftrag des Bundesministeriums für Bildung, Wissenschaft und Kultur; Bearb.: Otto Back et al., Redaktion: Herbert Fussy et al., 40. neu bearb. Aufl., Wien: öbv&hpt, 2006, 1008 S.,  (full version)
 Österreichisches Wörterbuch – auf der Grundlage des amtlichen Regelwerks (neue Rechtschreibung); herausgegeben im Auftrag des Bundesministeriums für Bildung, Wissenschaft und Kultur; Bearb.: Otto Back et al., Redaktion: Herbert Fussy et al., 40. neu bearb. Aufl., Wien: öbv&hpt, 2006, 864 S.,  (school edition)
 Österreichisches Wörterbuch – auf der Grundlage des amtlichen Regelwerks (neue Rechtschreibung); Ebner, Jakob, u. a., 40. neu bearb. Aufl., Wien: öbv&hpt, 2006,  (small version)

Further reading
 Gregor Retti (1999): Austriazismen in Wörterbüchern. Zum Binnen- und Außenkodex des österreichischen Deutsch. phil. Diss. Innsbruck. 
 Gregor Retti (1991): Das Österreichische Wörterbuch. Entwicklung, Wortbestand, Markierungssysteme. Dipl.-Arb. Innsbruck. 
 Rudolf Muhr: Österreichisches Aussprachewörterbuch, österreichische Aussprachedatenbank (Adaba)''; inkl. CD mit 75.964 Audiofiles; Frankfurt am Main; Wien (u.a.): Lang, 2007, 524 S., 

German dictionaries
Languages of Austria
Spelling dictionaries